"The Lie" is a political and social criticism poem probably written by Sir Walter Raleigh circa 1592.  Speaking in the imperative mood throughout, he commands his soul to go "upon a thankless errand" and tell various people and organizations of their misdeeds and wrongdoings.  And if they object, Raleigh commands, publicly accuse them to be lying, or "give them the lie."  To "give the lie" was a common phrase in Raleigh's time of writing.

Synopsis
The poem is written in 13 stanzas in an ABABCC rhyme scheme.  Raleigh begins with an energetic determination to expose the truth, especially in the socially elite, although he knows his doing so will not be well received.
Go, Soul, the body's guest,
Upon a thankless errand;
Fear not to touch the best;
The truth shall be thy warrant:
From there the poem moves quickly through a variety of scenes and situations of falsehood and corruption, all of which Raleigh condemns.  The second and third stanzas accuse the court of being arrogant and yet wholly rotten, the church of being inactive and apathetic despite its teachings, and those in government of favoritism and greed, respecting only those in large numbers.

History and authorship
Scholars are not certain that Raleigh is the true author of the poem, which was published after Raleigh's death.  This is one of Raleigh's most anthologized poems.

References
 http://faculty.goucher.edu/eng211/raleghthe_lie_and_guiana.htm

External links
 

British poems
Works by Walter Raleigh